Elmer Floyd (born April 20, 1948) is a former Democratic member of the North Carolina House of Representatives. He represented the 43rd district (containing parts of Cumberland County) from 2009 until 2021. Floyd is African-American.

During the 2016 legislative session, Floyd was one of 11 Democrats to vote in favor of House Bill 2, the controversial "Bathroom Bill." In 2020, Floyd lost the Democratic primary for his (somewhat redrawn) seat to progressive Kimberly Hardy, who then lost the general election.

Committee assignments

2019-2020 session
Appropriations 
Appropriations - General Government (Vice Chair)
Ethics (Vice Chair)
Redistricting (Vice Chair)
Election Law and Campaign Finance Reform
Insurance 
Rules, Calendar, and Operations of the House

2017-2018 session
Appropriations
Appropriations - General Government
Elections and Ethics Law
Rules, Calendar, and Operations of the House
Commerce and Job Development
Homeland Security, Military, and Veterans Affairs
Regulatory Reform
University Board of Governors Nominating

2015-2016 session
Appropriations
Appropriations - General Government (Vice Chair)
Elections
Rules, Calendar, and Operations of the House
Commerce and Job Development
Homeland Security, Military, and Veterans Affairs
Local Government
State Personnel

2013-2014 session
Appropriations
Elections
Insurance
Rules, Calendar, and Operations of the House
Commerce and Job Development
Homeland Security, Military, and Veterans Affairs
Government
State Personnel

2011-2012 session
Appropriations
Elections
Insurance
Commerce and Job Development
Homeland Security, Military, and Veterans Affairs
Government
State Personnel

2009-2010 session
Appropriations
Commerce, Small Business, and Entrepreneurship
Homeland Security, Military, and Veterans Affairs
Local Government II
Education
Environment and Natural Resources

Electoral history

2022

2020

2018

2016

2014

2012

2010

2008

2006

2004

2002

References

External links

Living people
1948 births
People from Fayetteville, North Carolina
Fayetteville State University alumni
20th-century African-American people
21st-century American politicians
21st-century African-American politicians
African-American state legislators in North Carolina
Democratic Party members of the North Carolina House of Representatives